A lacto-vegetarian (sometimes referred to as a lactarian; from the Latin root lact-, milk) diet is a  diet that abstains from the consumption of meat as well as eggs, while still consuming dairy products such as milk, cheese, yogurt, butter, ghee, cream, and kefir.

History
The concept and practice of lacto-vegetarianism among a significant number of people comes from ancient India. 

An early advocate of lacto-vegetarianism was the Scottish physician George Cheyne who promoted a milk and vegetable-based diet to treat obesity and other health problems in the early 18th century.

During the 19th century, the diet became associated with naturopathy. German naturopaths Heinrich Lahmann and Theodor Hahn promoted lacto-vegetarian diets of raw vegetables, whole wheat bread, and dairy products such as milk. 

In the 20th century, lacto-vegetarianism was promoted by the American biochemist Elmer McCollum and the Danish physician and nutritionist Mikkel Hindhede. In 1918, McCollum commented that "lacto-vegetarianism should not be confused with strict vegetarianism. The former is, when the diet is properly planned, the most highly satisfactory plan which can be adopted in the nutrition of man." 

Hindhede became a food advisor to the Danish government during World War I and was influential in introducing a lacto-vegetarian diet to the public. The system of rationing restricted meat and alcohol so the Danish population were mostly living on a diet of milk and vegetables. During the years of food restriction from 1917 to 1918, both mortality and morbidity decreased; the mortality rate dropped by 34%, the lowest death rate ever reported for Denmark. Hindhede's dieting ideas expressed in his scientific publications, along with those written by other Scandinavian scientists, were translated in German and well received amongst the right-wing political spectrum in post-war Germany. Subsequently, lacto-vegetarianism was strongly supported by German life reformers (Lebensreform) and became influential on some of the leading exponents of the National Socialist movement.

The uric-acid free diet of Alexander Haig was lacto-vegetarian. On this diet only cheese, milk, nuts, certain vegetables, and white bread could be eaten. 

Mahatma Gandhi was a notable lacto-vegetarian, who drank milk daily. In 1931, Gandhi commented that: 

In 1936, Narasinh Narayan Godbole authored Milk: The Most Perfect Food, a book defending lacto-vegetarianism and promoting the consumption of dairy products in opposition to meat.

Religion

Lacto-vegetarian diets are popular with certain followers of the Eastern religious traditions such as Jainism, Hinduism, Buddhism, and Sikhism. The core of their beliefs behind a lacto-vegetarian diet is the law of ahimsa, or non-violence.

Hinduism
According to the Vedas (Hindu holy scriptures), all living beings are equally valued. Also, Hindus believe that one's personality is affected by the kind of food one consumes, and eating flesh is considered bad for one's spiritual/mental well-being. It takes many more vegetables or plants to produce an equal amount of meat, many more lives are destroyed, and in this way more suffering is caused when meat is consumed. Although some suffering and pain is inevitably caused to other living beings to satisfy the human need for food, according to ahimsa, every effort should be made to minimize suffering. This is to avoid karmic consequences and show respect for living things, because all living beings are equally valued in these traditions, a vegetarian diet rooted in ahimsa is only one aspect of environmentally conscious living, relating to those beings affected by our need for food. However, this does not apply to all Hindus; some do consume meat, though usually not any form of beef.

In India, lacto vegetarian is considered synonymous to vegetarian, while eggs are considered a meat product. However, in other parts of the world, vegetarianism generally refers to ovo lacto vegetarianism instead, allowing eggs into the diet.

ISKCON encourages devotees to adopt a lacto-vegetarian diet and gives agriculture as the ideal economic basis of society.

Jainism

In the case of Jainism, the vegetarian standard is strict. It allows the consumption of only fruit and leaves that can be taken from plants without causing their death. This further excludes from the diet root vegetables like carrots, potatoes,  onions, garlic, radish, turnips, turmeric, etc since uprooting plants is considered as bad karma in Jainism. Jains also do not consume honey since it is considered as stealing food and also because honey collecting destroys bee hives and bee eggs and bee larvae inside it.

Sikhism

The Namdharis, a Sikh sect follow a strict lacto-vegetarian diet and have quoted verses from the Guru Granth Sahib endorsing vegetarianism, they also advocate for cow protection. The Damdami Taksal also cite the Guru Granth Sahib and advocate a strict lacto-vegetarian diet. Eating meat is not allowed in any form including eggs, fish and gelatine.

Lacto-vegetarians and vegans

The primary difference between a vegan and a lacto-vegetarian diet is the avoidance of dairy products. Vegans do not consume dairy products, believing that their production causes the animal suffering or a premature death, or otherwise abridges animal rights.

See also

 Lacto-ovo vegetarianism
 List of butter dishes
 List of cheese dishes
 List of dairy products
 List of diets
 List of vegetable dishes
 Ovo vegetarianism
 Sentient foods
 Vegetarianism
 VeggieBoards, a vegetarian forum

References

External links

 The Vegetarian Resource Group

Diets
Vegetarian diets
Intentional living
Animal rights

pt:Vegetarianismo#Lactovegetarianismo